Lennox is a census-designated place (CDP) in Los Angeles County, California, United States. The population was 22,753 at the 2010 census, down from 22,950 at the 2000 census.

Geography
Lennox's boundaries are Century Boulevard to the north (along with neighboring cities of Inglewood and Los Angeles), Interstate 405 (the San Diego Freeway) to the west, and Interstate 105 (the Glenn Anderson Freeway) to the south. Hawthorne Boulevard and Prairie Avenue make up portions of its eastern boundary with Inglewood. The CDP sits underneath the flight path of passenger jets landing at Los Angeles International Airport (LAX).

Demographics

2010
At the 2010 census Lennox had a population of 22,753. The racial makeup of Lennox was 8,623 (37.9%) White (1.9% Non-Hispanic White), 765 (3.4%) African American, 199 (0.9%) Native American, 177 (0.8%) Asian, 188 (0.8%) Pacific Islander, 11,811 (51.9%) from other races, and 990 (4.4%) from two or more races. Hispanic or Latino of any race were 21,162 persons (93.0%).

The census reported that 22,741 people (99.9% of the population) lived in households, 12 (0.1%) lived in non-institutionalized group quarters, and no one was institutionalized.

There were 5,250 households, 3,297 (62.8%) had children under the age of 18 living in them, 2,866 (54.6%) were opposite-sex married couples living together, 1,049 (20.0%) had a female householder with no husband present, 608 (11.6%) had a male householder with no wife present.  There were 456 (8.7%) unmarried opposite-sex partnerships, and 29 (0.6%) same-sex married couples or partnerships. 510 households (9.7%) were one person and 128 (2.4%) had someone living alone who was 65 or older. The average household size was 4.33.  There were 4,523 families (86.2% of households); the average family size was 4.49.

The age distribution was 7,553 people (33.2%) under the age of 18, 2,765 people (12.2%) aged 18 to 24, 6,926 people (30.4%) aged 25 to 44, 4,291 people (18.9%) aged 45 to 64, and 1,218 people (5.4%) who were 65 or older.  The median age was 27.7 years. For every 100 females, there were 105.6 males.  For every 100 females age 18 and over, there were 104.5 males.

There were 5,487 housing units at an average density of 5,018.3 per square mile, of the occupied units 1,569 (29.9%) were owner-occupied and 3,681 (70.1%) were rented. The homeowner vacancy rate was 0.9%; the rental vacancy rate was 4.5%.  7,805 people (34.3% of the population) lived in owner-occupied housing units and 14,936 people (65.6%) lived in rental housing units.

During 2009–2013, Lennox had a median household income of $37,659, with 32.3% of the population living below the federal poverty line.

2000
At the 2000 census there were 22,950 people, 5,049 households, and 4,382 families in the CDP. The population density was 21,257.5 inhabitants per square mile (8,204.7/km). The racial makeup of the CDP was 3.17% White, 4.15% African American, 1.02% Native American, 0.82% Asian, 1.39% Pacific Islander, 5.61% from other races, and 4.61% from two or more races. Hispanic or Latino make up 89.77%.

Of the 5,049 households 63.9% had children under the age of 18 living with them, 59.8% were married couples living together, 17.7% had a female householder with no husband present, and 13.2% were non-families. 9.2% of households were one person and 2.6% were one person aged 65 or older.  The average household size was 4.55 and the average family size was 4.70.

The age distribution was 39.0% under the age of 18, 12.4% from 18 to 24, 32.3% from 25 to 44, 12.7% from 45 to 64, and 3.6% 65 or older.  The median age was 24 years. For every 100 females, there were 106.4 males.  For every 100 females age 18 and over, there were 106.5 males.

The median household income was $28,273 and the median family income  was $27,991. Males had a median income of $19,235 versus $16,564 for females. The per capita income for the CDP was $8,499.  About 31.5% of families and 31.5% of the population were below the poverty line,
including 38.7% of those under age 18 and 15.5% of those age 65 or over.

Government

The Los Angeles County Board of Supervisors governs over Lennox like a city council, and is part of Supervisorial District 2, by the leadership of Holly Mitchell.

Housing

Homelessness
The Los Angeles Homeless Service Authority surveyed the unsheltered homeless population by City/Community and reported as of January 24, 2018, Lennox has an unsheltered homeless population of 175. The homeless population does not include the youth from ages 18–24, LAHSA reports the youth count by Council District(CD), Service Planning Area(SPA), and Supervisorial District(SD). In 2018 there were: 36(20.6%) unsheltered persons in cars, 3(1.7%) unsheltered persons in makeshift shelters, 33(18.9%) unsheltered persons in RVs/Campers, 40(22.9%) unsheltered persons in tents, 28(16%) unsheltered persons in vans, and 35(20%) unsheltered persons on the street. In 2017 there was an unsheltered homeless population of 143. The unsheltered homeless count in 2017 was: 38(26.6%) unsheltered persons in cars, 17(11.9%) unsheltered persons in makeshift shelters, 25(17.5%) unsheltered persons in RVs/Campers, 0(0%) persons in tents, 22(15.4%) unsheltered persons in vans, and 41(28.7%) unsheltered persons on the street. In 2016 Lennox had an unsheltered homeless population of 139. The unsheltered homeless count in 2016 was: 26(18.7%)unsheltered persons in cars, 0(0%) unsheltered persons in makeshift shelters, 24(17.3%) unsheltered persons in RVs/Campers, 0(0%) unsheltered persons in tents, 14(10.1%) unsheltered persons in vans, 75(53.9%) unsheltered persons on the street. Between 2016 and 2017 there was a 3.12% increase in unsheltered persons, and between 2017 and 2018 there was a 21.58% increase in unsheltered persons.

Education
The Lennox Elementary School District and the Centinela Valley Union High School District serve the city through 10 schools, two early education centers, five elementary schools, one middle School, and several high schools:
 Lennox Mathematics, Science & Technology Academy
 Animo Leadership Charter High School

Public services
The Los Angeles County Sheriff's Department (LASD) operates the South Los Angeles Station in West Athens, serving Lennox.

The Los Angeles County Department of Health Services operates the Curtis Tucker Health Center in Inglewood, serving Lennox.

Flight path air pollution
In 2014, an air quality study found harmful ultrafine particles from the takeoffs and landings at Los Angeles International Airport to be much greater magnitude than previously thought.

See also
 South Central Los Angeles

References

External links

Census-designated places in Los Angeles County, California
Census-designated places in California